Artostan is an album by Arto Tunçboyacıyan, recorded in 2004 and released in 2005.

Track listing 
"Tikran Solo"
"Artostan Radio Signal"
"Mr. Artostan"
"Hello Good People"
"Sound of Silence"
"I’m a Good Crazy Boy"
"Earth Giving Birth"
"Don’t Say Nothing"
"Everything is Going to Be Okay"
"I Love You D"
"Travelling to The Sun"
"Abush"
"Back Home"
"Funny Bular"
"Fast Like A Turtle"
"With Peace"
"Little Protesta"
"Have a Nice Day"

Arto Tunçboyacıyan albums
2005 albums